Petr Němec (born 7 June 1957) is a former football midfielder and manager from Czech Republic.

Career

Club
Němec played mostly for Baník Ostrava from his native city of Ostrava. He contributed to the best period in the history of the club. During his years as a player of the club, Baník won the Czechoslovak First League in 1980 and 1981. Baník also won the Czechoslovak Cup in 1978.

National team
He was a member of the national teams that won the gold medal at the 1980 Summer Olympics in Moscow and the bronze medal at the 1980 UEFA European Championship.

Němec obtained a total number of five caps for his native country, between 24 March 1981 and 23 September 1981.

Coaching career
He later began a coaching career, and worked in Poland from 2001 until 2019.

References

External links
 Petr Nemec at Footballdatabase
 Profile at ČMFS website

1957 births
Living people
Association football midfielders
Czech footballers
Czechoslovak footballers
Footballers at the 1980 Summer Olympics
Olympic gold medalists for Czechoslovakia
Olympic footballers of Czechoslovakia
Czechoslovakia international footballers
UEFA Euro 1980 players
FC Baník Ostrava players
FK Teplice players
Czech football managers
Czech expatriate football managers
Śląsk Wrocław managers
Widzew Łódź managers
Flota Świnoujście managers
Arka Gdynia managers
Warta Poznań managers
Sportspeople from Ostrava
Olympic medalists in football
Czech expatriate sportspeople in Poland
Expatriate football managers in Poland

Medalists at the 1980 Summer Olympics
Czech National Football League managers
FK Ústí nad Labem managers